Feitian Award for Outstanding Actress (中国电视剧飞天奖优秀女演员奖) is a main category of the Feitian Awards.

2020s

2010s

2000s

1990s

1980s

Notes

References 

Actress
Television awards for Best Actress